Green Lake is a lake in the South Cariboo region of British Columbia, Canada, located east of 70 Mile House.  The lake is a popular recreational residential area frequented by owners from the Lower Mainland.  Several locations around the lake are part of Green Lake Provincial Park.

See also
Interlakes
Cariboo Plateau

References
BCGNIS listing "Green Lake (lake)" 

Lakes of the Cariboo
Unincorporated settlements in British Columbia
Lillooet Land District